Ole Einar Martinsen (born 11 March 1967 is a retired Norwegian football defender.

He joined Kongsvinger from Eidsvold Turn in 1988. After five seasons he played one season for Rosenborg. After three more seasons in Kongsvinger he played two for Lillestrøm, before four ultimate seasons for Kongsvinger. During his last stay the club dropped from the first to the third tier. Martinsen continued in third-tier club Larvik Fotball, then fourth-tier Langesund/Stathelle and sixth-/fifth-tier Stathelle og Omegn.

Martinsen was capped twice for Norway.

References

1967 births
Living people
Norwegian footballers
People from Eidsvoll
Eidsvold TF players
Kongsvinger IL Toppfotball players
Rosenborg BK players
Lillestrøm SK players
Eliteserien players
Norwegian First Division players
Association football defenders
Association football midfielders
Norway international footballers
Sportspeople from Viken (county)